Liohippelates is a genus of eye gnats in the family Chloropidae. There are about 11 described species in Liohippelates.

Species
 Liohippelates apicatus (Malloch, 1913)
 Liohippelates bicolor (Coquillett, 1898)
 Liohippelates bishoppi (Sabrosky, 1941)
 Liohippelates collusor (Townsend, 1895)
 Liohippelates currani (Aldrich, 1931)
 Liohippelates flaviceps (Loew, 1863)
 Liohippelates flavipes (Loew, 1866)
 Liohippelates pallipes (Loew, 1863)
 Liohippelates peruanus (Becker, 1912)
 Liohippelates pusio (Loew, 1872)
 Liohippelates robertsoni (Sabrosky, 1941)

References

Further reading

External links

 Diptera.info

Oscinellinae